Seaman Dennis Conlan (1838 – December 2, 1870) was an American soldier who fought in the American Civil War. Conlan received the country's highest award for bravery during combat, the Medal of Honor, for his action aboard the  during the First Battle of Fort Fisher on 23 December 1864. He was honored with the award on 31 December 1864.

Biography
Conlan was born in New York, New York in 1838. He enlisted into the United States Navy. He died on 2 December 1870 and his remains are interred at the Calvary Cemetery in New York.

Medal of Honor citation

See also

List of American Civil War Medal of Honor recipients: A–F

References

1838 births
1870 deaths
People of New York (state) in the American Civil War
Union Navy officers
United States Navy Medal of Honor recipients
American Civil War recipients of the Medal of Honor